Feria del Sol, or Carnaval Taurino de America, is an international cultural festival held in the city of Mérida, Venezuela every February of the year. The Feria festival is held alongside the carnival feast. The festival includes bull competitions, cultural expositions, commercial and zootechnic expositions, concerts, parades, sports, and a voting competition for La Reina Del Sol.

History
The city of Mérida or City of the Knights had celebrated its historic past in Venezuela, but it did not have fairs similar to the cities of San Cristóbal, Barquisimeto, Maracaibo, or Táriba. Therefore, a group of amateurs got the idea to build a Plaza de Toros (Plaza of Bulls), so that Mérida had a taurine calendar and a fair counted among the most important of the country. The fair was set for 9 and 10 December, as the feast of Immaculate Conception coincided with the beginning of the month.  For the bullfighting, César Faraco, Manuel Benítez "El Cordobés", Francisco Rivera "Paquirri", Julio Aparicio, Curro Girón, Paco Camino and the mounted bullfighter, Juan Cañedo, who is of Mexican origin, fought the bulls of Félix Rodríguez, "Achury Vejo" and "Ambaló", who all originated in the country of Colombia.

Heavy rainfall impeded the first run, resulting in two runs being held on the second day: one in the morning hours and the other during the afternoon; it was the first time this had happened in the same arena in Venezuela. Previously in Caracas there had been two runs on the same day, but in two different arenas, the "Circo Metropolitano" and the "Nuevo Circo".

In December 1968, the fair wasn't celebrated, though bullfighting did occur on 13 April 1968 on the occasion of Holy Saturday. A stupendous closing was fought by "Dosgutiérrez", Alfredo Leal, Curro Girón and Pepe Cáceres. Then it was decided to celebrate these fairs so that they coincided with the carnivals already known as Feria del Sol; thus in 1969 the first bullfighting carnival took place with three run of bulls, on 15–17 February. The first poster consisted of bulls of "Valparaíso" for Alfredo Leal, Daniel "Matatoba" Santiago, Manuel Benítez "El Cordobés" and the Venezuelan Lucio Requena. The first ear of the fair was for Alfredo Leal.

Since then, the fair has developed into one of the most important fairs of Venezuela, as well as the taurine world. The fair of the "Immaculate" was celebrated in 1990, 1991, and 1997, but with very little acceptance.

Bibliography
Guide EDT/Lonely Planet, Venezuela, EDT srl, 2007,  
Susan Brushaber, Arnold Greenberg, Venezuela Alive, (Alive Guides Series, Hunter Travel Guides), Hunter Publishing, Inc, 1998

References

External links
 Official Website of the Feria del Sol
  Second Official Website of the Feria del Sol

Venezuelan culture
Carnivals in Venezuela
Bullfighting
Annual events in Venezuela